Paulin Lanteri (22 March 1902 – 19 August 1981) was a French racing cyclist. He rode in the 1928 Tour de France.

References

1902 births
1981 deaths
French male cyclists
Place of birth missing